Torrenticolidae is a family of torrent mites in the order Trombidiformes. There are about 5 genera and at least 20 described species in Torrenticolidae.

Genera
 Monatractides 
 Neoatractides 
 Pseudotorrenticola 
 Testudacarus Walter, 1928
 Torrenticola Piersig, 1896

References

Further reading

 
 
 

Trombidiformes
Acari families